Cerdia is a genus of flowering plants belonging to the family Caryophyllaceae.

Its native range is Mexico.

Species:
 Cerdia virescens Moc. & Sessé ex DC.

References

Caryophyllaceae
Caryophyllaceae genera